Dithioerythritol (DTE) is a sulfur containing sugar derived from the corresponding 4-carbon monosaccharide erythrose.  It is an epimer of dithiothreitol (DTT).  The molecular formula for DTE is C4H10O2S2.

Like DTT, DTE makes an excellent reducing agent, although its standard reduction potential is not quite as negative, i.e., DTE is slightly less effective at reducing than DTT. This is presumably because the orientation of the OH groups in its cyclic disulfide-bonded form (oxidized form) is less stable due to greater steric repulsion than their orientation in the disulfide-bonded form of DTT. In the disulfide-bonded form of DTT, these hydroxyl groups are trans to each other, whereas they are cis to each other in DTE.

References

External links

Thiols
Vicinal diols